The 1987–88 North Carolina Tar Heels men's basketball team represented the University of North Carolina from Chapel Hill, North Carolina.

Led by head coach Dean Smith, the Tar Heels completed yet another in a long line of impressive seasons, with an ACC Regular Season title, a top ten ranked team, and having reached all the way to the Elite Eight in the NCAA tournament. After the season, longtime assistant coach Roy Williams would depart to become head coach of that season's national championship, Kansas. Williams would eventually leave Kansas to become the head coach of the Tar Heels since 2003, Williams would win national Championships with the Tar Heels in 2005, 2009, and 2017, surpassing Smith as having the most national Championships at UNC with three.

Roster

Schedule and results

|-
!colspan=9 style=| Non-conference Regular Season

|-
!colspan=9 style=| ACC Regular season

|-
!colspan=9 style=| Non-conference Regular season

|-
!colspan=9 style=| ACC Regular season

|-
!colspan=9 style=| ACC Tournament

|-
!colspan=9 style=| 1988 NCAA tournament

Rankings

References

North Carolina Tar Heels men's basketball seasons
Tar
Tar
North Carolina
North Carolina